Georges Gereidi (born 1924) is a Lebanese alpine skier. He competed in the men's giant slalom at the 1956 Winter Olympics.

References

External links
 

1924 births
Possibly living people
Lebanese male alpine skiers
Lebanese male cross-country skiers
Olympic alpine skiers of Lebanon
Olympic cross-country skiers of Lebanon
Alpine skiers at the 1956 Winter Olympics
Cross-country skiers at the 1956 Winter Olympics
Place of birth missing (living people)